Lodha Altamount is a postmodern luxury residential skyscraper project located in the billionaires row of Mumbai, India. It has been designed by Hadi Teherani.

The previously existing Washington House, home to US Consul General, was a three-story building, covering an area of 2,702 square meters. It falls under the Coastal Regulation Zone 2 and is listed as a Grade 3 Property.

History 
Altamount Road has many pre-independence era residences, and important establishments such as the Indonesian and South African consulate bungalows. It is also home to many heritage buildings such as the official residence of the Chairman of Bombay Port Trust, the Municipal Commissioner of Mumbai and the General Manager of Western Railways. The residential bungalow of the Bombay Port Trust was originally made by George Wittet who also designed the Gateway of India.

Lodha Altamount is a luxury residential skyscraper of 43 floors on a half-acre site. It includes 8 podium levels, 2 floors for recreation, and 52 residences fully serviced by the hospitality company Saint Amand. The modern architecture style of the building was conceived by German-Iranian architect Hadi Teherani. It was constructed using a steel frame with an all-glass façade. Three sides have panoramic views of the Arabian Sea and the city of Mumbai. 

Lodha Altamount made history in November 2015 with the sale of the most expensive apartment in the country. A 10,000-square-foot apartment was sold for over 1.6 billion at 160,000 per square foot — the highest price per square foot ever paid in India. This also beat the record for the previous sale in the same building at 141,543 per square foot.

Location 
The development is built on the former location of Washington House, a property of US Consulate General for which the acquisition was announced in 2012 for a sum of 341.82 crore. The development is located at SK Barodawalla Marg, popularly known by its former name, Altamount Road. It has frequently featured in the list of most expensive residential streets of the world.

Architecture 
Lodha Altamount is designed as a multi-storied apartment building, with 43 floors in total and having 52 residential units. The amenities floor is on level eight, which comprises a gymnasium, spa, outdoor infinity pool, movie lounge, and a boardroom. The entrance lobby of Lodha Altamount features La Plage, Juan-les-Pins, an artwork by Spanish painter Pablo Picasso.

Design 

The façade of Lodha Altamount has been designed by Hamburg-based designer Hadi Teherani. The black, all-glass façade is built with the aim of providing privacy to the residents, while maintaining moderate climate conditions within.

See also 

 List of tallest buildings in India
 List of tallest buildings in Mumbai

References

External links
 Official Page

Residential skyscrapers in Mumbai
Postmodern architecture in India